Albert Joseph Pénot (28 February 1862 – 16 October 1930) was a French painter known for female nudes and landscapes. Today, he is more popularly and specifically recognized for a subset of paintings centering on women of darker, more macabre themes.

In 2018, his "La femme chauve-souris" was sold for £137,500.

Styles and themes

Pénot was concerned first and foremost with anatomically accurate portrayals of women. Singular female forms were the implicit focus of his work, whereas the worlds surrounding his characters are seldom realized beyond misty atmospheres and patches of shadow and light. Environments are incidental and are typically shrouded in haze, giving the figures themselves explicit priority. However, Pénot was more versatile in his artistry, and was not confined exclusively to female nudes: church figures were another of his subjects, in addition to occasional compositions depicting scenes of men and women from high society in narratives framed by more conventional settings.

Gallery

References

19th-century French painters
French male painters
20th-century French painters
20th-century French male artists
1862 births
1930 deaths
19th-century French male artists